Mino di Graziano (1289–1323) was an Italian painter, active in Siena. He is said to have painted frescoes in the Sala del Consiglio of the Palazzo Pubblico of Siena.

References

1289 births
1323 deaths
14th-century Italian painters
Italian male painters
Painters from Siena